The Battle of Guangzhou was an internal conflict within the National Revolutionary Army in the aftermath of Chiang Kai-shek's successes in the Northern Expedition. It occurred shortly after the Chinese Communist Party-led Guangzhou Uprising, which was crushed by Li Jishen's opponent Zhang Fakui. On December 28, 1927, Li Jishen's forces were able to capture Guangzhou, and Miao Peinan retreated to Huizhou. On December 29, 1927, local leader Li Fulin, an opponent of Li Jishen, was removed from office and replaced with Deng Yanhua.

Bibliography
中華民國國防大學編，《中國現代軍事史主要戰役表》

Conflicts in 1927
Conflicts in Guangdong
Conflicts in Guangzhou